Sebastes  glaucus, the gray rockfish or blue rockfish, is a species of marine ray-finned fish belonging to the subfamily Sebastinae, the rockfishes, part of the family Scorpaenidae. This species is found in deep waters of the Northwest Pacific.

Taxonomy
Sebastes glaucus was first formally described ain 1880 by the German zoologist and paleontologist Franz Martin Hilgendorf with the type locality given as Hokkaido in Japan. Some authorities place this species in the monotypic subgenus Emmelas. The specific name glaucus means “hoary blue”, an allusion which Hilgendorf did not explain but which is thought to be a reference to the grey or blackish body colour.

Description
Sebastes glaucus has a body which is dark grey with a yellow tiny, the yellow is most obvious on the fins. It has a large mouth with the maxilla reaching the rear edge of the orbit. There is a bulge between the eyes which do not bulge above the dorsal profile of the head and the only spines on the head are the nasal spines. There are 14 spines in the dorsal fin.

Distribution, habitat and biology
Sebastes glaucus is found in the northwestern Pacific Ocean. Here it occurs as far south as the Iwate Prefecture in Japan to the Sea of Okhotsk, in the northern Sea of Japan and in the Bering Sea. There are a few records from the Aleutian Islands off Alaska. Its biology is little known but like other rockfishes it is ovoviviparous.

References

External links
 
 

glaucus
Taxa named by Franz Martin Hilgendorf
Fish described in 1880